William Day Reeve  (1844-1925) was an Anglican priest.  
He was born in Harmston on 3 January 1844 and  educated at the CMS College, Islington going to Canada in 1868. He was ordained in 1868 and served at Fort Simpson from 1869 until he became Archdeacon of the Chipewyan in 1889. In 1891 he became Bishop of Mackenzie River, a post he held until 1907. Thereafter he was an Assistant Bishop in the Diocese of Toronto. He died on 12 May 1925.

References

1844 births
People from North Kesteven District
Anglican archdeacons in North America
Anglican bishops of Mackenzie River
20th-century Anglican Church of Canada bishops
1925 deaths
Alumni of the Church Missionary Society College, Islington
19th-century Anglican Church of Canada bishops